Bolo de arroz is a Portuguese rice muffin, common in Portugal, the Lusosphere countries and regions (which include Brazil, Angola, Mozambique, Cape Verde, São Tomé and Príncipe, Guinea-Bissau, Timor, Timor Leste, Goa, Malacca and Macau) and countries with significant Portuguese immigrant populations, such as Canada, Australia, Luxembourg, the United States, and France, among others.

References

receita de bolinho de arroz fácil
 receita de bolo caseiro
Receita de bolo fofinho
Dadinhos de tapioca receita

Portuguese cuisine
Portuguese desserts
Egg dishes
Rice cakes